The Archdiocese of Montréal is a Latin Church ecclesiastical territory or archdiocese of the Catholic Church in Canada. A metropolitan see, its archepiscopal see is the Montreal, Quebec. It includes Montreal and surrounding areas within Quebec.

Cathedrals 
The cathedral of the Archdiocese of Montréal is the Cathedral Basilica of Mary, Queen of the World and St. James the Greater (Basilique cathédrale de Marie-Reine-du-Monde et de Saint-Jacques-le-Majeur), built in 1894.

Previously the diocese had five cathedrals. (From 1821 to 1836, they were the seat of the auxiliary bishop of Quebec in Montréal.)

Notre-Dame Church (ancestor of today's Notre-Dame Basilica), 1821–1822
Chapel of the Hôtel-Dieu de Montréal, 1822–1825
Cathédrale Saint-Jacques, 1825–1852 (destroyed by fire, now part of the Judith-Jasmin pavilion of UQAM)
the chapel of the Asile de la Providence (corner of Sainte-Catherine and Saint-Hubert, site of the present Esplanade Émilie-Gamelin), 1852–1855
a small chapel at the site of the present archdiocese building, 1855–1894

History 
 1836.05.13: Established as Diocese of Montréal / Marianopolitan(us) (Latin), on territory split off from Archdiocese of Québec
 Lost territory 1852.06.08 to establish Diocese of Saint-Hyacinthe
 1886.06.08: Promoted as Metropolitan Archdiocese of Montréal / Marianopolitan(us) (Latin)
 Lost territories repeatedly : on 1892.04.05 to establish as suffragan Diocese of Valleyfield, on 1904.01.27 to establish as suffragan Diocese of Joliette, on 1933.06.09 to establish as suffragan Diocese of Saint-Jean-de-Québec, on 1951.06.23 to establish as suffragan Diocese of Saint-Jérôme
 2020.11.25 Former Quebec Superior Court justice Pepita Capriolo releases a report which found that some former officials in the Archdiocese of Montreal, including Marc Cardinal Ouellet, Jean-Claude Cardinal Turcotte and Anthony Mancini took no action against pedophile priest Brian Boucher after receiving reports he sexually abused boys, stating, among other things, that "The primary culprit is the lack of accountability of the people involved in Boucher's education, training and career. Complaints were 'passed on' and no one took responsibility for acting on them." The Catholic church assigned Capriolo to the investigate the Archdiocese of Montreal after Boucher pled to sex abuse charges in January 2019 and received an eight year prison sentence.

Statistics 
As per 2014, it pastorally served 1,724,357 Catholics (72.3% of 2,386,038 total) on 947 km² in 170 parishes and 35 missions with 901 priests (377 diocesan, 524 religious), 87 deacons, 3,817 lay religious (741 brothers, 3,076 sisters) and 16 seminarians.

Ecclesiastical province 

The Metropolitan Archbishop of Montréal's province has as suffragan sees: 
 Roman Catholic Diocese of Joliette, daughter 
 Roman Catholic Diocese of Saint-Jean-Longueuil, daughter 
 Roman Catholic Diocese of Saint-Jérôme, daughter 
 Roman Catholic Diocese of Valleyfield, daughter.

Leadership

Ordinaries

Below is a list of individuals who have led the Archdiocese of Montreal and its antecedent jurisdictions since its founding.

Bishops of Montreal
 Jean-Jacques Lartigue (1836–1840), previously auxiliary Bishop of Quebec in Montréal (1821–1836)
 Ignace Bourget (1840–1876)
 Édouard-Charles Fabre (1876–1886)

Archbishops of Montreal
 Édouard-Charles Fabre (1886–1896)
 Paul Bruchési (1897–1939) 
 Georges Gauthier (1939–1940)
 Joseph Charbonneau (1940–1950) 
 Cardinal Paul-Émile Léger (1950–1968)
 Cardinal Paul Grégoire (1968–1990)
 Cardinal Jean-Claude Turcotte (1990–2012)
 Christian Lépine (2012–present)

Coadjutor archbishops
Under the Code of Canon Law, the coadjutor bishop has the right of succession (cum jure successionis) upon the death, retirement or resignation of the diocesan bishop he is assisting.  All coadjutor ordinaries except for John Charles Prince eventually succeeded to become head of the Archdiocese of Montreal or its antecedent jurisdictions.

 Ignace Bourget (1837–1840), as coadjutor bishop
 John Charles Prince (1844–1852), as coadjutor bishop; did not succeed to the see
 Édouard-Charles Fabre (1873–1876), as coadjutor bishop
 Georges Gauthier (1923–1939)
 Joseph Charbonneau (1940)

Auxiliary episcopate 
 Coadjutor Bishop: Joseph Larocque (1852.07.06 – 1860.06.22)
 Coadjutor Bishop: John Charles Prince (1844.07.05 – 1852.06.08)
 Coadjutor Bishop: Ignace Bourget (later Archbishop) (1837.03.10 – 1840.04.19)
 Auxiliary Bishop Alain Faubert (2016.04.19 – ...), Titular Bishop of Vicus Pacati
 Auxiliary Bishop Thomas Dowd (2011.07.11 – ...), Titular Bishop of Treba
 Auxiliary Bishop: Christian Lépine (later Archbishop) (2011.07.11 – 2012.03.20)
 Auxiliary Bishop:  André Gazaille (2006.02.11 – 2011.07.11)
 Auxiliary Bishop: Lionel Gendron, P.S.S. (2006.02.11 – 2010.10.28)
 Auxiliary Bishop: Anthony Mancini (later Archbishop) (1999.02.18 – 2007.10.18)
 Auxiliary Bishop: Louis Dicaire (1999.02.18 – 2004.06.19)
 Auxiliary Bishop: André Rivest (1995.06.27 – 2004.06.19)
 Auxiliary Bishop: Neil E. Willard (1995.06.27 – 1998.03.25)
 Auxiliary Bishop: Jean-Claude Turcotte (later Archbishop and Cardinal) (1982.04.14 – 1990.03.17)
 Auxiliary Bishop: Jude Saint-Antoine (1981.03.20 – 2006.02.11)
 Auxiliary Bishop: Gérard Tremblay, P.S.S. (1981.03.20 – 1991.08.27)
 Auxiliary Bishop: Jean-Marie Lafontaine (1979.04.18 – 1981.06.03)
 Auxiliary Bishop: Leonard James Crowley (1971.02.08 – 1997.03.26)
 Auxiliary Bishop: Norman Joseph Gallagher (1966 – 1970.04.16)
 Auxiliary Bishop: Adrien André Maria Cimichella, O.S.M. (1964.06.05 – 1996.04.25)
 Auxiliary Bishop: Paul Grégoire (later Archbishop and Cardinal) (1961.10.26 – 1968.04.20)
 Auxiliary Bishop: Léo Blais (1959.03.18 – 1971.05.11)
 Auxiliary Bishop: Valérien Bélanger (1956.03.16 – 1983.02.19)
 Auxiliary Bishop: Laurent Morin (1955.09.08 – 1959.02.28)
 Auxiliary Bishop: Lawrence-Patrick Whelan (1941.06.28 – 1980.10.04)
 Auxiliary Bishop: Joseph-Conrad Chaumont (1941.06.28 – 1966.10.08)
 Auxiliary Bishop: Alphonse-Emmanuel Deschamps (1925.02.20 – 1940.06.23)
 Auxiliary Bishop: Georges Gauthier (later Archbishop) (1912.06.28 – 1923.04.05)
 Auxiliary Bishop: François-Théophile-Zotique Racicot (1905.01.14 – 1915.09.14

Other priests of this diocese who became bishops
 Charles-François-Calixte Morisson, appointed Coadjutor Bishop of Vancouver Island, British Columbia in 1862 (resigned from episcopate)
 Louis-Zéphirin Moreau, appointed Bishop of Saint-Hyacinthe, Québec, in 1875; beatified in 1987
 Narcisse Zéphirin Lorrain, appointed Vicar Apostolic of Pontiac, Ontario in 1882
 Richard Alphonsus O’Connor, appointed Bishop of Peteborough, Ontario in 1889
 Joseph-Médard Émard, appointed Bishop of Valleyfield, Québec in 1892
 Joseph-Guillaume-Laurent Forbes, appointed Bishop of Joliette, Québec in 1913
 Peter Joseph Monahan, appointed Bishop of Calgary, Alberta in 1932
 Émilien Frenette, appointed Bishop of Saint-Jérôme, Québec in 1951
 Alexander Carter, appointed Coadjutor Bishop of Sault Sainte Marie, Ontario in 1956
 William Edward Power, appointed Bishop of Antigonish, Nova Scotia in 1960
 Gerald Emmett Carter, appointed Auxiliary Bishop of London, Ontario in 1961; future Cardinal
 Charles-Omer Valois, appointed Bishop of Saint-Jérôme, Québec in 1977
 Robert Harris, appointed Auxiliary Bishop of Sault Sainte Marie, Ontario in 2002
 Paul Terrio (priest here, 1970-2001), appointed Bishop of Saint Paul in Alberta in 2012

See also 
 List of Catholic dioceses in Canada

References

Sources and external links
 
 GCatholic, with Google map - data for all sections
 (Arch)Diocese of Montréal
 catholichierarchy.org retrieved July 13, 2006

Christianity in Montreal